This is a list of books which have been featured on BBC Radio 4's Book of the Week during 2013.

January

 07-11 – The Examined Life by Stephen Grosz, read by Peter Marinker.
 14–18 – The Real Jane Austen: A Life in Small Things by Paula Byrne, read by Emma Fielding.
 21–25 – The Pike: Gabriele D'Annunzio, Poet, Seducer and Preacher of War by Lucy Hughes-Hallett, read by Haydn Gwynne.
 28-01 – Return of a King: The Battle for Afghanistan by William Dalrymple, read by Tim Pigott-Smith.

February

 04-08 – Benjamin Britten: A Life in the Twentieth Century by Paul Kildea, read by Alex Jennings.
 11–15 – Mad Girl's Love Song by Andrew Wilson, read by Hayley Atwell.
 25-01 – Far From the Tree by Andrew Solomon, read by Kerry Shale.

March

 04-08 – Bedsit Disco Queen by Tracey Thorn, read by author.
 11–15 – The Last Days of Detroit by Mark Binelli, read by John Schwab.
 18–22 – The World until Yesterday by Jared Diamond, read by Crawford Logan.
 25–29 – Comandante (book) by Rory Carroll, read by Jack Klaff.

April

 01-05 – The Love and Wars of Lina Prokofiev by Simon Morrison, read by Sian Thomas.
 08-12 – Mom and Me and Mom by Maya Angelou, read by Adjoa Andoh.
 15–19 – She Left Me the Gun by Emma Brockes, read by Alison Pettitt.
 22–26 – Letters from Italy, by Gustavo Piga, Lucia Annunziata, Carlo Sibilia, Dacia Maraini, and Annalisa Piras.
 29-03 – Margaret Thatcher: The Authorized Biography by Charles Moore, read by Nicholas Farrell.

May

 06-10 – A Sting in the Tale by Dave Goulson, read by Tim McInnerny.
 13–17 – Perilous Question: The Drama of the Great Reform Bill 1832 by Antonia Fraser, read by Adrian Scarborough.
 20–24 – Falling Upwards by Richard Holmes, read by Rory Kinnear.
 27–31 – The North (and Almost Everything in It) by Paul Morley, read by author.

June

 03-07 – Maggie and Me by Damian Barr, read by author.
 10–14 – An Englishman Aboard by Charles Timoney, read by Mark Heap.
 17–21 – Alexandria: The Last Nights of Cleopatra by Peter Stothard, read by Kenneth Cranham.
 24–28 – The Reason I Jump by Naoki Higashida, read by Kasper Hilton-Hille.

July

 01-05 – The Cooked Seed by Anchee Min, read by Chipo Chung.
 08-12 – A Long Walk Home by Judith Tebbutt, read by Penny Downie.
 15–19 – Permanent Present Tense by Suzanne Corkin, read by Debora Weston.
 22–26 – 1913, The Year Before the Storm by Florian Illies, read by Michael Maloney.
 29-02 – The Pink Sari Revolution by Amana Fontanella-Khan, read by Meera Syal.

August

 05-09 – The Sea Inside by Philip Hoare, read by Anthony Calf
 12–16 – Sounds Like London - 100 Years of Black Music in the Capital by Lloyd Bradley read by Ben Onwukwe.
 19–23 – Operación Masacre by Rodolfo Walsh, read by Nigel Anthony.
 26–30 – Nilsson: The Life of a Singer-Songwriter by Alyn Shipton, read by Kerry Shale.

September

 02-06 – When Britain Burned the White House by Peter Snow, read by Jamie Parker
 09-13 – Deep Sea and Foreign Going: Inside Shipping, the Invisible Industry by Rose George, read by Susie Riddell
 16–20 – The Inheritor's Powder - A Cautionary Tale of Poison, Betrayal and Greed by Sandra Hempel, read by author.
 23–27 – Empress Dowager Cixi: The Concubine Who Launched Modern China by Jung Chang, read by Pik-Sen Lim.
 30-11 – Beowulf translated and read by Seamus Heaney.

October

 14–18 – Historic Heston by Heston Blumenthal read by author.
 21–25 – Bonkers: My Life in Laughs by Jennifer Saunders read by author.
 28-01 – An Astronaut's Guide to Life on Earth by Chris Hadfield, read by Garrick Hagon.

November

 04-08 – Olivier by Philip Ziegler, read by Toby Jones.
 11–15 – The Letters of John F Kennedy edited by Martin W Sandler, read by Colin Stinton.
 18–22 – The Screwtape Letters by C. S. Lewis, read by Simon Russell Beale.
 25–29 – Mitterrand: A Study in Ambiguity by Philip Short, read by Henry Goodman.

December

 02-06 – Penelope Fitzgerald: A Life by Hermione Lee, read by Penelope Wilton.
 09-13 – Long Walk to Freedom by Nelson Mandela, read by John Kani.
 16–20 – Darling Monster the letters of Lady Diana Cooper edited and read by John Julius Norwich.
 23–27 – Love, Nina: Despatches From Family Life by Nina Stibbe, read by Rebekah Staton.
 30-03 – Man Belong Mrs Queen by Matthew Baylis, read by author.

Lists of books
Lists of radio series episodes